

This is a list of the National Register of Historic Places listings in Warren County, Mississippi.

This is intended to be a complete list of the properties and districts on the National Register of Historic Places in the city of Vicksburg and elsewhere in Warren County, Mississippi, United States. Latitude and longitude coordinates are provided for many National Register properties and districts; these locations may be seen together in a map.

There are 75 properties and districts listed on the National Register in the county, including 3 National Historic Landmarks.  Another 2 properties were once listed but have been removed.

Current listings

|}

Former listings

|}

See also
 
 List of National Historic Landmarks in Mississippi
 National Register of Historic Places listings in Mississippi

References

 
Warren County